The Clue in the Old Album is the twenty-fourth volume in the Nancy Drew Mystery Stories series. It was first published in 1947 under the pseudonym Carolyn Keene.

Plot summary

Nancy witnesses a purse snatching and pursues the thief. She rescues the purse, but not its contents, then is asked by the owner, a doll collector, to do some detective work. "The source of light will heal all ills, but a curse will follow him who takes it from the gypsies." This is one of the clues Nancy is given to find an old album, a lost doll, and a missing gypsy violinist. The young sleuth never gives up her search, though Nancy faints after being injected with poison by a French-swordsman doll, is run off the road in her car by an enemy, and sent several warnings to give up the case.

References

External links
The Clue in the Old Album at Fantastic Fiction

Nancy Drew books
1947 American novels
1947 children's books
Grosset & Dunlap books
Children's mystery novels